Donnacha Cody (born 24 December 1985) is an Irish hurler who played as a corner-back for the Kilkenny senior team.

Born in Kilkenny, Cody first played competitive hurling during his schooling at St. Kieran's College. He arrived on the inter-county scene at the age of seventeen when he first linked up with the Kilkenny minor team. He made his senior debut during the 2006 championship. Cody found it difficult to break into the starting fifteen, and won two Leinster medals.

At club level Cody is a one-time All-Ireland medallist with James Stephens. In addition to this he has also won two Leinster medals and three championship medals.

Cody's father, Brian, won several All-Ireland medals between 1973 and 1986, before later managing the team to ten All-Ireland titles, while his mother, Elsie, played camogie with Wexford.

Throughout his career Cody made 3 championship appearances. He retired from inter-county hurling following the conclusion of the 2008 championship.

Honours

Player

St. Kieran's College
All-Ireland Colleges Senior Hurling Championship (2): 2003, 2004
Leinster Colleges Senior Hurling Championship (2): 2003, 2004

James Stephens
All-Ireland Senior Club Hurling Championship (1): 2005
Leinster Senior Club Hurling Championship (1): 2004, 2005
Kilkenny Senior Hurling Championship (3): 2004, 2005, 2011

Kilkenny
All-Ireland Senior Hurling Championship (3): 2006 (sub), 2007 (sub), 2008 (sub)
Leinster Senior Hurling Championship (3): 2006, 2007, 2008 (sub)
National Hurling League (1): 2006 (sub)
All-Ireland Minor Hurling Championship (1): 2003
Leinster Minor Hurling Championship (1): 2003

References 

1985 births
Living people
James Stephens hurlers
UCC hurlers
Kilkenny inter-county hurlers